"I've Been Losing You" is a song by Norwegian band A-ha, released as the lead single from their second studio album, Scoundrel Days (1986). It reached number one in Denmark and Norway, and number eight in the United Kingdom. It achieved worldwide sales of over 1.1 million copies.

The music video was shot in a wide arena in Los Angeles.

B-side 

"This Alone Is Love" was the B-side, in an earlier, rawer form than the one that was re-recorded for Stay on These Roads. Both versions can be easily differentiated by their duration and the use of certain instruments. The earlier version is notable for its organ solo that sets in at 3:36 until the end of the song. The Scoundrel Days version is notable for its guitar solo. The chorus ("It will make my last breath pass out at dawn / It will make my body dissolve out in the blue") is derived from the song "May the Last Danse Be Mine" by Waaktaar and Furuholmen's previous band, Bridges.

Track listings
7-inch single: Warner Bros. / W8594 (United Kingdom)
 "I've Been Losing You" (Single Version) - 4:25
 "This Alone Is Love" (Previously unreleased) - 4:33

12-inch single: Warner Bros. / W8594T United Kingdom)
 "I've Been Losing You" (Extended Mix) - 6:58
 "I've Been Losing You" (Dub Mix) - 4:25
 "This Alone Is Love" (Previously unreleased) - 4:33

 Tracks 1 and 2 remixed by Jellybean Benitez.

7-inch single: Warner Bros. / 7-28594 (United States)
 "I've Been Losing You" (Single Version) - 4:25
 "This Alone Is Love" (Previously unreleased) - 4:33

12-inch single: Warner Bros. / 9 20557-0 (United States)
 "I've Been Losing You" (Extended Mix) - 6:58
 "I've Been Losing You" (Dub Mix) - 4:25
 "This Alone Is Love" (Previously unreleased) - 4:33
 Tracks 1 and 2 remixed by Jellybean Benitez.

7-inch single: Warner Bros. / 92-85947 Canada
 "I've Been Losing You" (Edit) - 3:36
 "This Alone Is Love" (Previously unreleased) - 4:33

Charts

Weekly charts

Year-end charts

Certifications

MTV Unplugged appearance 
In 2017, A-ha appeared on the television series MTV Unplugged and played and recorded acoustic versions of many of their popular songs for the album MTV Unplugged – Summer Solstice in Giske, Norway, including "I've Been Losing You" (featuring Lissie).

References

1986 singles
1986 songs
A-ha songs
Number-one singles in Denmark
Number-one singles in Norway
Songs written by Paul Waaktaar-Savoy
Warner Music Group singles